The 2008 Mount Union Purple Raiders football team was an American football team that represented the University of Mount Union in the Ohio Athletic Conference (OAC) during the 2008 NCAA Division III football season. In their 23rd year under head coach Larry Kehres, the Purple Raiders compiled a perfect 15–0 record, won the OAC championship, advanced to the NCAA Division III playoffs, and defeated , 31–26, in the national championship game.

During the course of the season, senior tailback Nate Kmic became the all-time rushing leader in college football history. He concluded his collegiate career with 8,074 rushing yards and 130 touchdowns.

The team played its home games at Mount Union Stadium in Alliance, Ohio.

Schedule

References

Mount Union
Mount Union Purple Raiders football seasons
NCAA Division III Football Champions
College football undefeated seasons
Mount Union Purple Raiders football